Jorge Núñez is a paralympic athlete from Spain competing mainly in category T12 sprint events.

Jorge was part of the Spanish visually disabled 4x100m relay team that won gold medals in both 1992 and 1996 Summer Paralympics.  At both games he also competed in the individual 100m and 200m adding an individual bronze in the 100m in 1996.

References

Paralympic athletes of Spain
Athletes (track and field) at the 1992 Summer Paralympics
Athletes (track and field) at the 1996 Summer Paralympics
Paralympic gold medalists for Spain
Paralympic bronze medalists for Spain
Living people
Paralympic athletes with a vision impairment
Medalists at the 1992 Summer Paralympics
Medalists at the 1996 Summer Paralympics
Year of birth missing (living people)
Paralympic medalists in athletics (track and field)
Spanish male sprinters
Visually impaired sprinters
Paralympic sprinters
Spanish blind people